Scie may refer to:

La Scie, Newfoundland and Labrador, town in Canada
Scie (river), a river in northern France
Rivière à la Scie, a river in Quebec, Canada

See also
SCIE (disambiguation)